Crnja can refer to:

 Nova Crnja, a village and municipality in Vojvodina, Serbia.
 Srpska Crnja, a village in Vojvodina, Serbia.